Govind Perumal (September 25, 1925 – September 17, 2002 in Nala Sopara) was an Indian field hockey player who won two gold medals with the Indian team at the 1952 and 1956 Summer Olympics respectively.

References

External links
 

1925 births
2002 deaths
Field hockey players from Maharashtra
Olympic field hockey players of India
Olympic gold medalists for India
Field hockey players at the 1952 Summer Olympics
Field hockey players at the 1956 Summer Olympics
Indian male field hockey players
Olympic medalists in field hockey
Medalists at the 1956 Summer Olympics
Medalists at the 1952 Summer Olympics